Abylaikhan Zhuzbay (born 18 November 1993) is a Kazakhstani male curler.

Teams and events

Men's

Mixed

Mixed doubles

References

External links

1993 births
Living people
Kazakhstani male curlers
Curlers at the 2017 Asian Winter Games
Competitors at the 2017 Winter Universiade